Topaz, in comics may refer to:

Topaz (Marvel Comics), a Marvel Comics sorceress

See also
Topaz (disambiguation)